The 2012 Kebbi State gubernatorial by-election occurred on March 31, 2012. PDP candidate Usman Saidu Nasamu Dakingari won the election, defeating CPC Abubakar Abubakar and 13 other candidates.

Abubakar Abubakar was CPC candidate, Kabiru Tanimu Turaki was ACN candidate.

Results
Usman Saidu Nasamu Dakingari from the PDP won the election defeating other 14 candidates.

Usman Saidu Nasamu Dakingari, (PDP)- 875,492

Abubakar Abubakar, CPC- 17,918

Kabiru Tanimu Turaki, ACN- 4,656

Sulaiman Muhammad Argungu, ANPP- 2,528

Mohammed Nasiru Magaji, NTP

Abubakar Umaru, PPA

Umaru Birnin Kebbi, APGA

Sani Abubakar, CPP

Mohammed Nura, PPP

Attari Sani, AD

Lawan Moad, ALP

Muhammed Danbare, LP

Tukur Musa Yaro, NSDP

Sahabi Atiku, NNPP- 361

Hauwau Mohammed, ADC- 325

References 

Kebbi State gubernatorial elections
Kebbi State gubernatorial by-election
Kebbi State gubernatorial by-election